Isaac Zokoué (September 17, 1944 — September 12, 2014) was a leading theologian in the Central African Republic. For 14 years was dean of the leading French-speaking evangelical seminary, Faculte de Theologie Evangelique de Bangui.

Zokoué wrote a number of books and articles about harmonizing Christian ideas to African cultures, including  “Jésus-Christ sauveur : le mystère des deux natures: perspective africaine,” his doctorate thesis in theology at the University of Strasbourg.

Because of his prominence as a religious leader, he was asked to lead the Preliminary Committee for the National Debate in 2003, which was meant to find a way of ending the cycle of coups and civil war in the country.

References

1944 births
2014 deaths
Central African Republic Christians
Central African Republic clergy
Christian theologians
University of Strasbourg alumni